Solomon Wilson Building, also known as the Scheerer Building, is a historic commercial building located at Wabash, Wabash County, Indiana.  It was built in 1883, and is a -story, two bay by seven bay, Second Empire style brick building on a stone foundation.  It features a mansard roof with and elaborate dormer and a chamfered corner with a second story balcony.

It was listed on the National Register of Historic Places in 1984.  It is located in the Downtown Wabash Historic District.

References

Commercial buildings on the National Register of Historic Places in Indiana
Second Empire architecture in Indiana
Commercial buildings completed in 1883
Buildings and structures in Wabash County, Indiana
National Register of Historic Places in Wabash County, Indiana
Wabash, Indiana
1883 establishments in Indiana